Erasmus Julius Nyárády (7 April 1881 - 10 June 1966) was a Romanian botanist of Hungarian ethnicity. In the Hungarian style his name appears as Nyárády Erazmus Gyula.

Career 
After secondary school education in Târgu Mureș, he attended the Teacher Training Institute in Cluj-Napoca (1900). He then studied at the Natural History Teachers' College in Budapest, graduating from the Faculty of Geography in 1904. He spent the next seven years teaching in the gymnasium of Kežmarok, then in 1911 moved back to Târgu Mureș. Meanwhile, he had begun to publish botanical papers, and in 1922 he was invited by the Romanian botanist Alexandru Borza to be curator of the Cluj-Napoca Botanical Garden, with a remit to expand the herbarium.

Between 1940 and 1944 together with Rezső Soó he published his 9-volume Kolozsvár és környékének flórája (Flora of Cluj and its environment). In 1942 he nominally retired, but did not stop his work. In 1948, the Romanian Academy elected him as a full member, and appointed him as member of the editorial board of the monumental Flora Reipublicae Socialisticae România, under the management of Traian Săvulescu, Editor in chief. He was volume coordinator for volumes VIII-XI, after the death of Săvulescu.

In 1953 he was awarded the Romanian People's Republic State Prize. He died in Budapest, and is buried in Cluj-Napoca (Romania) in the Házsongárdi Cemetery.

Some publications 
 Vizek és vízben bővelkedő talajok növényzetéről a Hargitában, 1929
 Marosvásárhely és környékén élő tavaszi és nyáreleji növények meghatározó könyve, Marosvásárhely, 1937
 A tordai hasadék monografikus ismertetése, Erdélyi Nemzeti Múzeum Növénytára, Kolozsvár, 1940-1944
 Kolozsvár és környékének flórája I-IX. füzet, B., Soó Rezső közreműködésével, Kolozsvár, 1941-1944
 Flora of Romania (Flora Reipublicae Socialisticae România) vol. I-XIII, Academia Republicii Socialiste România, Bucharest, 1952-1976
 Flora şi vegetaţia Munţilor Retezat, Academia Republicii Populare Române, 1958
 Szováta fürdő és környékének monográfiája (manuscript)

Taxa named after him 

 (Brassicaceae) Alyssum nyaradyi Bornm. & Gauba
 (Poaceae) Koeleria nyaradyi Ujhelyi
 (Salicaceae) Salix nyaradyi Woł.

Sources 
Váczy, C. 1967. Erasmus Julius Nyárády, 1881-1966. Taxon 16 ( 5): 425-430

References 

1881 births
1966 deaths
People from Mureș County
Romanian people of Hungarian descent
Titular members of the Romanian Academy
20th-century Hungarian botanists
Romanian botanists
Recipients of the Order of the Star of the Romanian Socialist Republic
Members of the Romanian Academy of Sciences